Vashian-e Takht Shir (also Romanized as Vāshīān-e Takht Shīr; also known as Takht Shīr-e Vāshīān and Vāshīān) is a village in Miyankuh-e Gharbi Rural District, in the Central District of Pol-e Dokhtar County, Lorestan Province, Iran. At the 2006 census, its population was 143, in 27 families.

References 

Towns and villages in Pol-e Dokhtar County